Lothar Metz (Germany, 16 January 1939 – Germany, 23 January 2021) was a German wrestler.

Career
He won an Olympic silver medal in Greco-Roman wrestling in 1960, and a bronze medal in 1964. He won an Olympic gold medal in 1968, competing for East Germany.

References

External links
 

1939 births
2021 deaths
German male sport wrestlers
Olympic wrestlers of the United Team of Germany
Olympic wrestlers of East Germany
Olympic silver medalists for the United Team of Germany
Olympic bronze medalists for the United Team of Germany
Olympic gold medalists for East Germany
Olympic medalists in wrestling
Wrestlers at the 1960 Summer Olympics
Wrestlers at the 1964 Summer Olympics
Wrestlers at the 1968 Summer Olympics
Wrestlers at the 1972 Summer Olympics
Medalists at the 1960 Summer Olympics
Medalists at the 1964 Summer Olympics
Medalists at the 1968 Summer Olympics
20th-century German people
21st-century German people